Henry Joseph Shindika (born 3 November 1985 in Mwanza) is a Tanzanian footballer who currently plays for Mtibwa Sugar.

Career 
Shindika started playing his competitive football at Simba SC in the Tanzanian Premier League. For a long time he has been the captain of the club which has its headquarters along Msimbazi Street, in Dar es Salaam. In February 2009, Shindika signed his first professional contract with Kongsvinger of Norway.

International career 
Shindika has also been a member of the Tanzania's national team since 2006. He has played 46 games and scored two goals for Taifa Stars, and in addition has 6 non-FIFA caps.

Career statistics

International

Statistics accurate as of match played 7 September 2013

International goals

References

1985 births
Living people
People from Mwanza Region
Tanzanian footballers
Tanzania international footballers
Tanzanian expatriate footballers
Association football midfielders
Expatriate footballers in Norway
Tanzanian expatriate sportspeople in Norway
Kongsvinger IL Toppfotball players
Norwegian First Division players
Eliteserien players
Simba S.C. players
Mtibwa Sugar F.C. players
Tanzanian Premier League players
2009 African Nations Championship players
Tanzania A' international footballers